Suzanne Lebsock (born December 1, 1949 at Williston, ND) is an American author and historian. Her works include her first book The Free Women of Petersburg: Status and Culture in a Southern Town, 1784-1860 which was published in 1984 and won the Bancroft Prize, and A Murder in Virginia: Southern Justice on Trial. She specializes in women's history.

Lebsock has held fellowships from the John Simon Guggenheim Memorial and MacArthur foundations.

Personal life
Lebsock was formerly married to Richard Levis McCormick, a former president of Rutgers University. They have two children, Betsy and Michael.

Published works
 A Murder in Virginia: Southern Justice on Trial
 Visible Women: New Essays on American Activism (Women in American History) [with Nancy A Hewitt]
 The Free Women of Petersburg: Status and Culture in a Southern Town, 1784–1860
 A Share of Honor: Virginia Women, 1600-1945.  [with Kym Rice]
 Woman Suffrage and White Supremacy: A Virginia Case Study

References

Living people
21st-century American historians
1949 births
MacArthur Fellows
American women historians
20th-century American historians
People from Williston, North Dakota
Writers from North Dakota
20th-century American women writers
21st-century American women writers
Bancroft Prize winners